Sir Sydney Castle Roberts (3 April 1887 – 21 July 1966) was a British author, publisher and university administrator. He was a well-known and popular figure around Cambridge throughout his life, and was recognised as a publisher of skill and distinction.

Early years 
Roberts was born in Birkenhead, the son of Frank Roberts, a civil engineer. He attended Brighton College and Pembroke College, Cambridge. During World War I, he served as a lieutenant in the Suffolk Regiment and was wounded in the Third Battle of Ypres.

Career 
He was Secretary of Cambridge University Press from 1922 to 1948, Master of Pembroke College, Cambridge from 1948 to 1958, Vice-Chancellor of University of Cambridge from 1949 to 1951, and Chairman of the British Film Institute from 1952 to 1956. He was an author, publisher and biographer and a noted Sherlockian, being president of the Sherlock Holmes Society of London. According to Jon Lellenberg, Roberts is responsible for the popularisation of the Sherlockian game of criticism. He was knighted in 1958.

The National Portrait Gallery holds three photographic portraits of Roberts by Elliott & Fry, made in 1949.

Personal life

He married, firstly, Irene Wallis (died 1932), daughter of Arnold Joseph Wallis, Fellow of Corpus Christi College, Cambridge. They had two daughters and a son. After her death, in 1938, he married a second time to Marjorie Dykes, widow of Dr Meredith Blake Robson Swann. Roberts was stepfather to Hugh Swann, cabinet maker to Queen Elizabeth II, and of Michael Swann, former chairman of the BBC.

He died in Addenbrooke's Hospital in Cambridge.

Publications

 A Picture Book of British History; Cambridge University Press, 1914
 The Story of Doctor Johnson: being an introduction to Boswell's Life; Cambridge University Press, 1919
 A History of the Cambridge University Press 1521–1921; Cambridge University Press, 1921
 Doctor Johnson In Cambridge: Essays In Boswellian Imitation; Putnam, 1922
 Lord Macaulay: The Pre-eminent Victorian; Oxford University Press, 1927
 The charm of Cambridge; A & C Black, 1927
 An Eighteenth-century Gentleman and other essays; Cambridge University Press, 1930
 Doctor Watson: Prolegomena to the study of a biographical problem; Faber & Faber, 1931
 Introduction to Cambridge; Cambridge University Press, 1934
 Pembroke College, Cambridge: a short history; Cambridge University Press, 1936
 Zuleika in Cambridge; Heffer & Sons, 1941
 Springs Of Hellas And Other Essays, with Memoir by S.C. Roberts, Cambridge University Press, 1945
 British Universities (Britain in Pictures); Collins, 1947
 The Sir Walter Scott Lectures for 1948; Oliver and Boyd, 1948
 Sherlock Holmes: Selected Stories: with an introduction by S C Roberts, Oxford University Press, 1951
 Holmes & Watson: A Miscellany (Otto Penzler's Sherlock Holmes Library); Oxford University Press, 1953
 Samuel Johnson; Longmans, 1954
 The Evolution of Cambridge Publishing; Cambridge University Press, 1956
 Doctor Johnson, and others; Cambridge University Press, 1958
 Edwardian Retrospect; UK English Association, 1963
 Adventures with Authors; Cambridge University Press, 1966
 The Further Adventures of Sherlock Holmes: The Adventure of the Megatherium Thefts, Penguin Books 1985

References

External links
 

1887 births
1966 deaths
People from Birkenhead
Alumni of Pembroke College, Cambridge
Masters of Pembroke College, Cambridge
Knights Bachelor
Vice-Chancellors of the University of Cambridge
People educated at Brighton College
20th-century British novelists
British non-fiction writers
British male novelists
20th-century British male writers
Male non-fiction writers